The Darwin Tennis International is a professional tennis tournament played on outdoor hard courts. It is currently part of the International Tennis Federation (ITF) Men's Circuit and Women's Circuit. It has been held in City of Darwin, Australia since 2009. The tournament was revived in 2018, having not been held since 2011.

Past finals

Men's singles

Women's singles

Men's doubles

Women's doubles

External links 
 ITF search 

 
ATP Challenger Tour
Hard court tennis tournaments
ITF Women's World Tennis Tour
Tennis tournaments in Australia
Recurring sporting events established in 2009